The Country of Others (published as In the Country of Others in the United States) is a 2020 novel by Leïla Slimani.

Plot

Production 
The Country of Others is Slimani's third novel and the first in a planned trilogy based on her family history. It is Slimani's first historical novel.

Slimani said that after her second novel Lullaby won the Prix Goncourt in 2016 she wanted to "write something that was difficult because as an artist who had some congratulations, it’s important to do something where there is the possibility of failing".

Faber and Faber acquired publishing rights in the United Kingdom and the Commonwealth, excluding Canada, from Éditions Gallimard in March 2021.

Reception 
Tessa Hadley the novel as "uncannily good at searching out the uncomfortable pressure points where class hurts and privilege excludes and crucifies". Jonathan Myerson noted that "incidents are included even though they seem to have no pay-off". The Times John Phipps called the novel a "panoramic, ambitious tale". Houman Barekat criticised Slimani's "impassive prose style" as "dreary", and "conspicuously over-reliant on certain go-to words". Meena Kandasamy characterised the work as "a novel about sex and power".

The novel was longlisted for the 2022 Andrew Carnegie Medal for Excellence in Fiction.

References 

2020 French novels
Novels set in the 1940s
Novels set in the 1950s
Novels set in Morocco
Éditions Gallimard books
Faber and Faber books